HMS Falcon was a fourteen gun brig sloop launched on 23 September 1782 from Hills Yard in Sandwich. She was expended as a fireship in the raid on Dunkirk on 7 July 1800 Her crew, under Captain Butt, shared with nineteen other ships the prize money awarded for the cutting out of the French frigate La Diserée during the same operation.

References

Brigs of the Royal Navy
1782 ships